András Csonka (born 1988) is a Hungarian para table tennis player. He started playing table tennis aged nine when his brother played the sport as a hobby.

References

Living people
1988 births
Table tennis players from Budapest
Hungarian male table tennis players
Paralympic table tennis players of Hungary
Medalists at the 2016 Summer Paralympics
Table tennis players at the 2016 Summer Paralympics
Paralympic medalists in table tennis
Paralympic silver medalists for Hungary
Table tennis players at the 2020 Summer Paralympics